D'Ante Smith (born June 8, 1998) is an American football offensive tackle for the Cincinnati Bengals of the National Football League (NFL). He played college football at East Carolina.

Early life and high school
Smith grew up in Augusta, Georgia and attended Grovetown High School, where he was a member of the football and wrestling teams. After being named second-team All-Area and All-Region as a junior, Smith committed to play college football at Appalachian State. During his senior season, he decommitted from Appalachian State and ultimately signed to play at East Carolina.

College career
Smith sustained a season-ending injury in the opening game of his freshman season and used a medical redshirt. Going into his senior year, Smith had started 33 games. Smith suffered an injury in the season opener of his redshirt senior season. He eventually decided to opt out of the remainder of the year and train for the 2021 NFL Draft.

Professional career

Smith was selected in the fourth round with the 139th overall pick of the 2021 NFL Draft by the Cincinnati Bengals. He signed his four-year rookie contract with Cincinnati on May 17. He was placed on injured reserve on October 16, 2021. He was activated on December 18.

References

External links 
East Carolina Pirates bio

1998 births
Living people
Players of American football from Augusta, Georgia
American football offensive tackles
East Carolina Pirates football players
Cincinnati Bengals players